Folketing elections were held in Denmark on 25 April 1876. The Liberals won a majority, whilst voter turnout was around 48.6%.

Results

References

Denmark
Elections in Denmark
1876 in Denmark
Denmark